Kanglung  is a town in eastern Bhutan. It is located in Trashigang District and is the location of Sherubtse College, one of the Royal University of Bhutan's academic institutes.

At the 2005 census, its population was 1,717.

References 

Populated places in Bhutan